A helium atom is an atom of the chemical element helium. Helium is composed of two electrons bound by the electromagnetic force to a nucleus containing two protons along with either one or two neutrons, depending on the isotope, held together by the strong force. Unlike for hydrogen, a closed-form solution to the Schrödinger equation for the helium atom has not been found. However, various approximations, such as the Hartree–Fock method, can be used to estimate the ground state energy and wavefunction of the atom.

Introduction

The quantum mechanical description of the helium atom is of special interest, because it is the simplest multi-electron system and can be used to understand the concept of quantum entanglement. The Hamiltonian of helium, considered as a three-body system of two electrons and a nucleus and after separating out the centre-of-mass motion, can be written as

The nuclear charge,  is 2 for helium. In the approximation of an infinitely heavy nucleus,  we have  and the mass polarization term  disappears, so that in atomic units the Hamiltonian simplifies to

It is important to note, that it operates not in normal space, but in a 6-dimensional configuration space . In this approximation (Pauli approximation) the wave function is a second order spinor with 4 components , where the indices  describe the spin projection of both electrons (z-direction up or down) in some coordinate system. It has to obey the usual normalization condition . A convenient basis consists of one anti-symmetric matrix (with total spin , corresponding to a singlet state)

and three symmetric matrices (with total spin , corresponding to a triplet state)

It is easy to show, that the singlet state is invariant under all rotations (a scalar entity), while the triplet can be mapped to an ordinary space vector , with the three components

The spin here only comes into play through the Pauli exclusion principle, which for fermions (like electrons) requires antisymmetry under simultaneous exchange of spin and coordinates

Parahelium is then the singlet state  with a symmetric function  and orthohelium is the triplet state  with an antisymmetric function . 
The total energy (as eigenvalue of ) is then for all cases  (independent of the symmetry).

This explains the absence of the  state (with ) for orthohelium, where consequently  (with ) is the metastable ground state.

If the electron-electron interaction term  is included, the Schrödinger equation is non separable. 
However, even if it is neglected, all states described above (even with two identical quantum numbers, like  with ) cannot be written as a product of one-electron wave functions:  — the wave function is entangled.
One cannot say, particle 1 is in state 1 and the other in state 2, and measurements cannot be made on one particle without affecting the other.

Nevertheless, quite good theoretical descriptions of helium can be obtained within the Hartree–Fock and Thomas–Fermi approximations (see below).

The Hartree–Fock method is used for a variety of atomic systems. However it is just an approximation, and there are more accurate and efficient methods used today to solve atomic systems. The "many-body problem" for helium and other few electron systems can be solved quite accurately. For example, the ground state of helium is known to fifteen digits. In Hartree–Fock theory, the electrons are assumed to move in a potential created by the nucleus and the other electrons.

Perturbation method
The Hamiltonian for helium with two electrons can be written as a sum of the Hamiltonians for each electron:

where the zero-order unperturbed Hamiltonian is

while the perturbation term:

is the electron-electron interaction.  is just the sum of the two hydrogenic Hamiltonians:

where

So:

where

Neglecting the electron-electron repulsion term, the Schrödinger equation for the spatial part of the two-electron wave function will reduce to the 'zero-order' equation

This equation is separable and the eigenfunctions can be written in the form of single products of hydrogenic wave functions:

The corresponding energies are (in atomic units, hereafter a.u.):

Note that the wave function

An exchange of electron labels corresponds to the same energy . This particular case of degeneracy with respect to exchange of electron labels is called exchange degeneracy. The proper wave function then must be composed of the symmetric (+) and antisymmetric(−) linear combinations:

This comes from Slater determinants.

The factor  normalizes . In order to get this wave function into a single product of one-particle wave functions, we use the fact that this is in the ground state. So . So the  will vanish, in agreement with the original formulation of the Pauli exclusion principle, in which two electrons cannot be in the same state. Therefore, the wave function for helium can be written as

Where  and  use the wave functions for the hydrogen Hamiltonian. For helium, Z = 2 from

where E = −4 a.u. which is approximately −108.8 eV, which corresponds to an ionization potential V = 2 a.u. (≅54.4 eV). The experimental values are E0 = −2.90 a.u. (≅ −79.0 eV) and Vp = 0.90 a.u. (≅ 24.6 eV).

The energy that we obtained is too low because the repulsion term between the electrons was ignored, whose effect is to raise the energy levels. As  gets bigger, our approach should yield better results, since the electron-electron repulsion term will get smaller.

So far a very crude independent-particle approximation has been used, in which the electron-electron repulsion term is completely omitted. Splitting the Hamiltonian showed below will improve the results:

where

and

 is a central potential which is chosen so that the effect of the perturbation  is small.

where  is a screening constant and the quantity  is the effective charge. The potential is a Coulomb interaction, so the corresponding individual electron energies are given (in a.u.) by

and the corresponding wave function is given by

If  was 1.70, that would make the expression above for the ground state energy agree with the experimental value E0 = −2.903 a.u. of the ground state energy of helium. Since  in this case, the screening constant is S = 0.30.

The variational method
To obtain a more accurate energy the variational principle can be applied to the electron-electron potential  using the wave function

After integrating this, the result is:

This is closer to the experimental value, but if a better trial wave function is used, an even more accurate answer could be obtained. An ideal wave function would be one that doesn't ignore the influence of the other electron. In other words, each electron represents a cloud of negative charge which somewhat shields the nucleus so that the other electron actually sees an effective nuclear charge Z that is less than 2. A wave function of this type is given by:

Treating Z as a variational parameter to minimize H. The Hamiltonian using the wave function above is given by:

The minimum value of Z needs to be calculated, so taking a derivative with respect to Z and setting the equation to 0 will give the minimum value of Z:

This shows that the other electron somewhat shields the nucleus reducing the effective charge from 2 to 1.69. So we obtain the most accurate result yet:

Where again,  represents the ionization energy of hydrogen.

By using more complicated/accurate wave functions, the ground state energy of helium has been calculated closer and closer to the experimental value −78.95 eV. The variational approach has been refined to very high accuracy for a comprehensive regime of quantum states by G.W.F. Drake and co-workers as well as J.D. Morgan III, Jonathan Baker and Robert Hill using Hylleraas or Frankowski-Pekeris basis functions. One needs to include relativistic and quantum electrodynamic corrections to get full agreement with experiment to spectroscopic accuracy.

Experimental value of ionization energy 
This value was measured experimentally.

See also

 Isotopes of helium
 Araki–Sucher correction
 Hydrogen molecular ion
 Lithium atom
 List of quantum-mechanical systems with analytical solutions
 Quantum field theory
 Quantum mechanics
 Quantum states
 Theoretical and experimental justification for the Schrödinger equation
 "Helium atom" on Wikiversity

References

Atoms
Quantum models
Helium